Drillia sesquitertia is a species of sea snail, a marine gastropod mollusk in the family Drilliidae.

Description
The length of the shell attains 21 mm, its diameter 7 mm.

Distribution
This species occurs in the demersal zone of the Atlantic Ocean off East Africa.

References

  Tucker, J.K. 2004 Catalog of recent and fossil turrids (Mollusca: Gastropoda). Zootaxa 682:1–1295

External links
 

sesquitertia
Gastropods described in 1904